Kim Jeong-hyun (born 1 June 1993) is a South Korean professional footballer who plays as a midfielder for Busan IPark in the K League 2.

Career
Jeong-hyun made his debut for Oita Trinita in the J2 League on 17 June 2012 against Mito HollyHock in which he started and played 88 minutes as Oita Trinita won the match 1–0.

Club statistics

References

External links
 
 

1993 births
Living people
Association football midfielders
Expatriate footballers in Japan
South Korean footballers
Oita Trinita players
Gwangju FC players
Seongnam FC players
J1 League players
J2 League players
K League 1 players
K League 2 players
South Korean expatriate footballers
South Korean expatriate sportspeople in Japan
Place of birth missing (living people)